Saccharoturris consentanea is an extinct species of sea snail, a marine gastropod mollusk in the family Mangeliidae.

Description
The length of the shell attains 6.2 mm, its diameter 2.7 mm.

(Original description) The fusiform-turreted shell contains about 8 whorls. These are sharply angulate, spirally lirate, the strongest thread forming the angle of the whorls and rising like the other threads into knobs upon the longitudinally elongate or variciform tubercles. The surface of the whorl above the keel is minutely lirate by fine spiral threads. The aperture is elongate, terminating in a moderate siphonal canal

Distribution
This extinct marine species was found in Oligocene strata of Jamaica.

References

External links
 Worldiwde Mollusc Species Data Base: Saccharoturris consentanea

consentanea
Gastropods described in 1896